The Bole–Tangale languages (also known as the A.2 West Chadic languages) are a branch of West Chadic languages that are spoken in various states of northeastern Nigeria.

Languages
The Bole–Tangale languages are:

Bole (Bole–Tangale) (A.2)
North (Bole proper): Bure, Bole, Gera, Geruma, Deno, Galambu, Giiwo, Kubi, Ngamo, Maaka (Maagha), Ɓeele, Daza (Dazawa), ?Pali, Karekare
South (Tangale): Kwaami, Pero, Piya-Kwonci, Kulung, Kholok, Nyam, Kushi (Goji), Kutto (Kupto), Tangale, Dera (Kanakuru)

Karekare is the most divergent language within the Bole branch, while Dera is the most divergent language within the Tangale branch.

Names and locations
Below is a comprehensive list of Bole–Tangale language names, populations, and locations from Blench (2019).

References

External links
The Yobe Languages Research Project by the late Russell G. Schuh of UCLA
 West Chadic resources at africanlanguages.org

West Chadic languages
Languages of Nigeria